Daniel Hugunin Jr. (February 6, 1790 – June 20, 1850) was an American politician from New York and the Wisconsin Territory.

Life
He was the son of Daniel Abraham Hugunin (1756–1828) and Mary (Garrabrance) Hugunin. He pursued classical studies. He served as a lieutenant in the War of 1812 and was taken prisoner at the Battle of Queenston Heights. On January 4, 1817, he married Clarissa Ann Van Horne at Schenectady, and they had five children, among them Daniel Clinton Huguenin (1825–1846), who died in the Mexican–American War.

At the United States House of Representatives elections in New York, 1824, Hugunin received a majority of the votes cast in the 20th congressional district, but while the greater part of the votes was returned for "Daniel Hugunin, jun.", a smaller part was returned for "Daniel Hugunin, junior" and "Daniel Hugunin". The votes for the latter two variants were counted as scattering, giving a plurality to Egbert Ten Eyck, the incumbent Jacksonian congressman. Hugunin contested the election of Ten Eyck, and was seated as an Adams man in the 19th United States Congress on December 15, 1825, holding office until March 3, 1827.

In 1828, Hugunin was elected one of the first trustees of the Village of Oswego.

On March 15, 1841, he was appointed by President William Henry Harrison as United States Marshal for Wisconsin Territory. He remained in office until August 31, 1844, when Charles M. Prevost was appointed to succeed Hugunin.

Hugunin later served as the harbor master at Kenosha. He died of a stroke on June 20, 1850 and was buried at Green Ridge Cemetery in Kenosha.

Sources

 [gives wrong death date]
Dictionary of the United States Congress and the General Government by Charles Lanman (Hartford, 1869; page 200)
Cases of Contested Elections in Congress 1789 to 1834 compiled by Matthew St. Clair Clarke and David A. Hall (Washington, D.C., 1834; Case LIII, pages 501ff)
Hugunin genealogy at Family Tree Maker

External links

1790 births
1850 deaths
Politicians from Kenosha, Wisconsin
19th-century American politicians
Politicians from Oswego, New York
United States Marshals
American military personnel of the War of 1812
National Republican Party members of the United States House of Representatives from New York (state)
War of 1812 prisoners of war held by the United Kingdom